Balsara is an Indian surname (Parsi/Hindu), similar to Bulsara, which indicates ancestry from Bulsar (Valsad). Notable people with the surname include:

Bhicaji Balsara, first Indian to be naturalised as a U.S. citizen
Christina Balsara, married name of Christina Stone, Singaporean model and businesswoman
Farrokh Bulsara, birth name of Freddie Mercury, British entertainer and leader of Queen
Poras Balsara, American engineer
Sam Balsara, Indian advertising executive

Indian surnames
Gujarati-language surnames
Parsi people
Hindu surnames
People from Valsad district